The Madness of King George is a 1994 British biographical historical comedy-drama film directed by Nicholas Hytner and adapted by Alan Bennett from his own 1991 play The Madness of George III. It tells the true story of George III of Great Britain's deteriorating mental health, and his equally declining relationship with his eldest son, the Prince of Wales, particularly focusing on the period around the Regency Crisis of 1788–89. Two text panels at the end of the film note that the colour of the King's urine suggests that he was suffering from porphyria, adding that the disease is "periodic, unpredictable and hereditary."

The Madness of King George won the BAFTA Awards in 1995 for Outstanding British Film and Best Actor in a Leading Role for Nigel Hawthorne, who was also nominated for the Academy Award for Best Actor. The film won the Oscar for Best Art Direction and was also nominated for Oscars for Best Supporting Actress for Mirren and Best Adapted Screenplay. Helen Mirren also won the Cannes Film Festival Award for Best Actress and Hytner was nominated for the Palme d'Or.

In 1999, the British Film Institute voted The Madness of King George the 42nd greatest British film of all time.

Plot
King George III's bout of madness in 1788 touched off the Regency Crisis of 1788 and triggered a power struggle between factions of Parliament under the Tory Prime Minister William Pitt the Younger and the reform-minded Leader of the Opposition Charles James Fox.

At first, the King's behaviour appears mildly eccentric. He is deeply concerned with the wellbeing and productivity of Great Britain and exhibits an encyclopedic knowledge of the families of even the most obscure royal appointments. He is devoted to his loving wife and their large brood of 15 children. However, he is growing more unsettled, partly over the loss of America. His memory fails, his behavior becomes erratic and hypersexual, he talks and talks, and his urine turns blue.

George, Prince of Wales, aggravates the situation, knowing that he will be named regent if the King becomes incapacitated.  George chafes under his father's relentless criticism, and yearns for greater freedom, particularly when it comes to choosing a wife. He married the woman everyone believes to be his mistress, Mrs. Fitzherbert, in a secret ceremony in 1785. Without his father's consent, the marriage is illegal. Even with consent, it would remove him from the succession, because Fitzherbert is a Catholic. He knows that he has the moral support of Fox, whose agenda includes abolition of the slave trade and friendlier relations with America. Knowing how to exacerbate the King's behaviour, the Prince arranges a concert of music by Handel. The King reacts as expected, interrupting the musicians, speaking lasciviously to Lady Pembroke, and finally assaulting his son.

In a private moment, the King tells Charlotte that he knows something is wrong. They are brutally interrupted when the Prince has them separated, supposedly on the advice of physicians. Led by the Prince of Wales' personal physician, Dr. Warren, the King is treated using the medical practices of the time, which focus on the state of his urine and bowel movements and include painful cupping and purgatives.

Lady Pembroke recommends Dr. Francis Willis, who cured her mother-in-law. Willis uses novel procedures. At his farm in Lincolnshire, patients work to gain “a better opinion of themselves.” He observes to an equerry “To be curbed, thwarted, stood up to, exercises the character.”  When the King insults him, foully, he is strapped into a chair and gagged. He will be restrained whenever he “swears and indulges in meaningless discourse” and “does not strive every day and always towards his own recovery”.

When the Prince has the King transferred to Kew, Charlotte watches as her beloved, bearded and wearing a soiled diaper and a straitjacket, struggles against being put in the coach. “Until you can govern yourself, you're not fit to govern others. And until you do so, I shall govern you,” Willis says. At Kew, the King spits soup at Willis, but gains control under the physician's intractable gaze. Later, the King, properly dressed, feeds himself to a round of applause from staff—but the delusions persist.

The Whig opposition confronts Pitt's increasingly unpopular Tory government with a proposal that would give the Prince powers of regency. Baron Thurlow, the Lord Chancellor, obtains and suppresses proof of the marriage. Fox wins, and The Regency Bill is printed. Thurlow comes to see the King and joins in a moving reading of King Lear. “I have remembered how to seem...” the King muses. “What, what!” an expression he has not used in 6 months. His urine is yellow.

Thurlow and the King arrive at Parliament in time to thwart the bill. The King forces the Prince to admit his marriage and to put away Fitzherbert. With the crisis averted, all those who have witnessed his suffering are summarily dismissed, including Greville. Fitzroy observes: “To be kind does not commend you to kings.”

Cheering crowds welcome the royal family to St. Paul's Cathedral. Willis stands by, but the King dismisses him.

“We must be a model family,” he declares; George wants “something to do.” “Smile at the people, wave at them. Let them see that we're happy. That's why we're here.” Saluting, Willis disappears into the crowd, where Mrs. Fitzherbert also smiles, wistfully.

Cast

 Nigel Hawthorne as King George III
 Helen Mirren as Queen Charlotte
 Ian Holm as Francis Willis
 Amanda Donohoe as Lady Pembroke, Lady of the Bedchamber
 Rupert Graves as Captain Greville
 Geoffrey Palmer as Doctor Warren
 Rupert Everett as George, Prince of Wales
 Jim Carter as Charles James Fox, Leader of the Opposition
 Julian Rhind-Tutt as Frederick, the Duke of York
 Julian Wadham as William Pitt the Younger, Prime Minister
 Anthony Calf as Lord Charles FitzRoy
 Adrian Scarborough as Fortnum
 John Wood as Lord Chancellor Lord Thurlow
 Jeremy Child as Black Rod
 Struan Rodger as Henry Dundas
 Barry Stanton as Sheridan
 Janine Duvitski as Margaret Nicholson
 Caroline Harker as Mrs. Fitzherbert
 Roger Hammond as Baker
 Cyril Shaps as Pepys
 Selina Cadell as Mrs. Cordwell
 Alan Bennett as a backbench MP
 Nicholas Selby as Speaker

Production
Alan Bennett insisted that director Nicholas Hytner and actor Nigel Hawthorne should be cast in the film version, after having acted in the play.

Title change
In adapting the play to film, the director Nicholas Hytner changed the name from The Madness of George III to The Madness of King George for American audiences, to clarify George III's royalty.  A popular explanation developed that the change was made because there was a worry that American audiences would think it was a sequel and not go to see it, assuming they had missed "I" and "II". An interview revealed: "That's not totally untrue," said Hytner, laughing. "But there was also the factor that it was felt necessary to get the word King into the title."

Filming locations
Principal photography took place from 11 July to 9 September 1994. The film was shot at Shepperton Studios and on location at:
 Arundel Castle, Arundel, West Sussex
 Divinity School, Oxford
 Broughton Castle, Banbury, Oxfordshire
 Eton College, Eton, Berkshire
 Royal Naval College, Greenwich
 St. Paul's Cathedral, London
 Syon House, Brentford, Middlesex
 Thame Park, Oxfordshire
 Wilton House, Wilton, Wiltshire

Reception

Box office
The Madness of King George was the second highest-grossing British film of the year, behind Shallow Grave, with a gross of £4.6 million in the UK. It debuted strongly at the US box office and went on to gross $15,238,689 in the United States and Canada and $27.4 million worldwide.

Critical response
The film received largely positive reviews from critics. On Rotten Tomatoes, the film has a 94% "Certified Fresh" score based on 47 reviews, with an average rating of 7.8/10. The site's consensus states: "Thanks largely to stellar all-around performances from a talented cast, The Madness of King George is a funny, entertaining, and immensely likable adaptation of the eponymous stage production."

Reviewing the film for Variety, Emanuel Levy praised the film highly, writing: "Under Hytner's guidance, the cast, composed of some of the best actors in British cinema, rises to the occasion... Boasting a rich period look, almost every shot is filled with handsome, emotionally charged composition."

John Simon of The National Review wrote, "The Madness of King George III has survived the transfer from stage to screen, and emerges equally enjoyable on film." Simon praised all the leading actors and most of the supporting cast with the exception of Jim Carter's portrayal of Fox, which he said lacked charisma.

Stanley Kauffmann of The New Republic wrote, "For those who, like myself, were disappointed in the play, the film contains pleasant surprises, all of them resulting from differences between the two arts."

Year-end lists
 2nd – Peter Rainer, Los Angeles Times
 8th – National Board of Review
 10th – Kenneth Turan, Los Angeles Times
 Top 10 runner-ups (not ranked) – Janet Maslin, The New York Times

Awards and honours

See also
 BFI Top 100 British films

Notes

References

External links
 
 
 
 
 
 

1994 films
1990s biographical drama films
1990s historical comedy-drama films
BAFTA winners (films)
Best British Film BAFTA Award winners
Biographical films about British royalty
British biographical drama films
British films based on plays
British historical comedy-drama films
Cultural depictions of George III
Cultural depictions of George IV
Cultural depictions of William Pitt the Younger
Films set in 1788
Films directed by Nicholas Hytner
Films produced by David Parfitt
Films set in Berkshire
Films set in England
Films set in London
Films set in Oxford
Films shot in Berkshire
Films shot in London
Films shot in Oxfordshire
Films shot in West Sussex
Films shot in Wiltshire
Films whose art director won the Best Art Direction Academy Award
Films with screenplays by Alan Bennett
The Samuel Goldwyn Company films
1994 directorial debut films
1990s English-language films
1990s British films